Built to Last is the thirteenth and final studio album by the Grateful Dead (their twentieth album overall). It was recorded between February 1 and October 20, 1989, and originally released on October 31, 1989.

The album was released on CD in 1989 by Arista Records before being rereleased in 2000 by BMG International. It was then remastered, expanded, and released as part of the Beyond Description (1973–1989) 12-CD box set in October 2004. The remastered version was later released separately on CD on April 11, 2006, by Rhino Records.

This album features the most songs by keyboard player Brent Mydland, who has four song credits, all of which are in collaboration with Dead lyricist  John Perry Barlow. This mirrored accurately Mydland's increasing vocal presence in the band over the decade he spent with the Dead.

Track listing

Personnel 

Grateful Dead:
 Jerry Garcia – guitar, vocals
 Bob Weir – guitar, vocals
 Brent Mydland – keyboards, vocals
 Phil Lesh – bass
 Bill Kreutzmann – drums
 Mickey Hart – drums, percussion

Production:
 John Cutler – producer, engineer
 Tom Flye – engineer
Justin Kreutzmann – engineer
Peter Miller – engineer
David Roberts – engineer
Jeff Sterling – engineer
Chris Wiskes – engineer

Bonus tracks production 
 "Foolish Heart" – recorded live at Alpine Valley Music Theater in East Troy, WI on July 19, 1989 (see also Fallout from the Phil Zone & Downhill from Here for more from this date)
 "Blow Away" – recorded live at John F. Kennedy Stadium in Philadelphia on July 7, 1989
 "California Earthquake (Whole Lotta Shakin' Goin' On)" – recorded live at The Spectrum in Philadelphia on October 20, 1989

Reissue production 

 David Lemieux – reissue producers
James Austin – reissue producers
 Reggie Collins – liner notes
Blair Jackson – liner notes
 Sheryl Farber – editorial supervision
 Cameron Sears – executive producer
 Joe Gastwirt – mastering, production consultant
 Tom Flye – mixing
 Robert Gatley – mixing assistant
 Hugh Brown, Steve Vance – art coordinator
 Jimmy Edwards – associate producer
Robin Hurley – associate producer
Hale Milgrim – associate producer
Scott Pascucci – associate producer
 Eileen Law – research
 Vanessa Atkins – project assistant
Steven Chean – project assistant
Bill Inglot – project assistant
Jeffrey Norman – project assistant
Randy Perry – project assistant
 John McEntire – coordination
 Ken Friedman – photography
Herbert Greene – photography
 Maude Gilman – artwork
 Greg Gyuricsko – artwork
 Dan Healy – concert sound
 Alton Kelley – direction, cover art
 John McEntire – coordination
 Billy Candelario – crew
Steve Parish  – crew
Harry Popick – crew
Robbie Taylor – crew

Charts 
Album – Billboard

Singles – Billboard

RIAA Certification

References 

Grateful Dead albums
1989 albums
Arista Records albums
Rhino Records albums
Albums produced by Jerry Garcia